This is the discography of American R&B/hip hop singer Colby O'Donis. Signed to Kon Live Distribution, O'Donis has released one studio album and four solo singles. O'Donis was featured in Lady Gaga's No. 1 single "Just Dance" in 2008 off her debut album, The Fame. The single has been certified 8× Multi-Platinum by the Recording Industry Association of America.

O'Donis' debut single, "What You Got", featured pop singer Akon. The song was the lead-off single to O'Donis' debut album, Colby O. It was the first of three singles released from the album, however, it was the only one to chart, reaching the Top 20 of the Billboard Hot 100. Other singles released from the album were "Don't Turn Back" and "Let You Go". O'Donis' album reached a peak of No. 41 on the Billboard 200 and No. 14 on the Top R&B/Hip-Hop Albums charts.

Studio albums

Singles

As lead artist

As featured artist

Production discography

2007
Colby O'Donis – Colby O
03. "She Wanna Go" 
07. "Take You Away"
09. "Saved You Money"
11. "Tell Me This" 
12. "Game For You"

2010
Che'Nelle – Feel Good
11. "Razor"

2011
Jordan Knight – Unfinished
01. "Let's Go Higher"

Music videos

Music videos

Featured music videos

References

O'Donis, Colby
O'Donis, Colby